The 1889 Calgary municipal election was scheduled for January 7, 1889 to elect a Mayor and six Councillors to sit on the fifth Calgary Town Council from January 21, 1889 to January 20, 1890.

Acclamation were declared in all seats upon close of nominations on December 31, 1888 so no election was held. The Calgary Weekly Herald praised the acclamation as evidence the town has reached a point where "citizens can bring themselves to forget past differences and rise superior to those bitter factional prejudices which have prevailed in the past" Prior to nominations for the election a group of local businessmen proposed a slate of candidates at a public meeting, and spread word that the candidates should not be challenged.

Results

Mayor
Daniel Webster Marsh

Councillors
James Bannerman
James Gerald Fitzgerald
Archibald Grant
George Clift King
George Murdoch
Wesley Fletcher Orr

See also
List of Calgary municipal elections

References

Sources
Frederick Hunter: THE MAYORS AND COUNCILS  OF  THE CORPORATION OF CALGARY Archived March 3, 2020

Municipal elections in Calgary
1889 elections in Canada
1880s in Calgary